Gianluca Marchetti (born June 18, 1993) is an Italian professional basketball player who currently plays the point guard position for Basket Barcellona of the A2 Gold Basket Series.

Career
Marchetti grew up in the Virtus Roma young team. He made his Serie A debut with Roma in 2010. He played in Rome since 2012, then he was loaned to Don Bosco Livorno.

On August 31, 2013, he signed a one-year contract with Vanoli Cremona so he returns to play in Serie A.

In the summer, he moved to Basket Barcellona of the A2 Gold Basket Series, the second-tier division of professional club basketball in Italy.

References

External links 
Eurobasket.com Profile
Lega Basket Profile

1993 births
Living people
People from Bracciano
Italian men's basketball players
Pallacanestro Virtus Roma players
Vanoli Cremona players
Point guards
Sportspeople from the Metropolitan City of Rome Capital